Chrołowice  is a village in the administrative district of Gmina Drohiczyn, within Siemiatycze County, Podlaskie Voivodeship, in north-eastern Poland.

According to the 1921 census, the village was inhabited by 162 people, among whom 137 were Roman Catholic, 12 Orthodox, and 13 Mosaic. At the same time, 143 inhabitants declared Polish nationality, 13 Jewish and 1 another. There were 24 residential buildings in the village.

References

Villages in Siemiatycze County